The Arboretum Habichtsborn, also known as the Arboretum Staufenberg, is an arboretum located at Forstamtsstraße 6, Escherode, several kilometers southeast of Staufenberg, Lower Saxony, Germany. It is maintained by the Niedersächsischen Forstlichen Versuchsanstalt, and contains about 150 types of woody plants, including Sequoiadendron specimens.

See also 
 List of botanical gardens in Germany

References 
 BGCI entry
 ZEFOD entry
 Galerie Göttinger Land entry
 Mammutbaum blog, with many photographs
 Staufenberg pamphlet
 Wolfgang Knigge, Giant Sequoia (Sequoiadendron giganteum (Lindl.) Buchholz) in Europe

Habichtsborn, Arboretum
Habichtsborn, Arboretum